Melanie George Smith (formerly Melanie George Marshall) is an American politician. She was a Democratic member of the Delaware House of Representatives from 2003 to 2019.

Smith was elected in 2002 to represent District 5 after winning the Democratic primary to replace Helene Keeley, who was running for the District 3 seat. The 2002 primary election was the last competitive race during her time in office, and she never faced an opponent in the general election.

In 2018, "dogged by questions about whether she still lived in the Bear district she represented," Smith announced would resign at the end of her term. Shortly before leaving office, she was criticized by open government advocates and Democratic Party officials for establishing a private business that would benefit from legislation she sponsored in her last month in office. She had previously stated that the legislation would not "have a material benefit for her" when advocating for the passage of the bill.

Smith earned her BA from the University of Pennsylvania and her JD from Georgetown University Law Center.

References

External links
 Official page at the Delaware General Assembly
 

Place of birth missing (living people)
1972 births
Living people
Delaware lawyers
Georgetown University Law Center alumni
Democratic Party members of the Delaware House of Representatives
People from Bear, Delaware
University of Pennsylvania alumni
Women state legislators in Delaware
21st-century American women politicians
21st-century American politicians